The chapters 424–686 of the Bleach manga series, written and illustrated by Tite Kubo, comprise two story arcs: the  and the . The plot follows the Soul Reaper Ichigo Kurosaki who is in charge of slaying Hollows, evil spirits that attack people. In these chapters, Ichigo and his friends first face Xcution, a gang of Fullbringers—supernaturally aware humans whose leader Ginjo Kujo was his predecessor as a Soul Reaper. After that, they must fight an army of Quincies—humans who can fight Hollows—known as the Wandenreich.

Bleach was published in individual chapters by Shueisha in Weekly Shōnen Jump magazine and was later collected in tankōbon (book) format. The "Lost Agent arc", going through volumes 49–54, was serialized between November 2010, and January 16, 2012. The following arc, covering volumes 55–74, was released from February 13, 2012, to August 22, 2016. Volume 49 was released on April 21, 2011, while the last volume was published on November 4, 2016.

An anime adaptation, produced by Studio Pierrot and TV Tokyo, was broadcast by TV Tokyo. The "Lost Agent" part was adapted into the series' 24-episode season 16, which started on October 11, 2011, and finished on March 27, 2012. The sixteenth season was its last before the anime entered a ten year hiatus.

North American licensee Viz Media serialized the individual chapters in Shonen Jump from its November 2007 to April 2012 issues. The series moved to the digital anthology Weekly Shonen Jump Alpha in January 2012 and Viz Media released it digitally as Shueisha published new chapters in Japan. Viz Media released the 49th volume October 2, 2012; the 74th and last was released on October 2, 2018. The company also re-released the series under the label of "3-in-1 Edition"; the book containing volume 49 was released on November 1, 2016, and the last was volume 25 (with original volumes 73 and 74), released on March 5, 2019.

Volume list

Notes

References

External links
Official Bleach website 
Official Shonen Jump Bleach website

Bleach chapters (424-686)